

One of the Oldest Cross Country Races in the World 

The Waterhouse Byrne Baird Shield is the oldest and longest consecutively run club cross-country event in Ireland, and one of the oldest in the world.

History

It was first held in 1896, for members of the then-new Donore Harriers Club, when a Dublin jeweller by the name of Mr. Samuel Waterhouse, presented the Donore Harriers club with a silver shield for a 10-mile handicap cross-country race. The shield was known as the 'Donore Harriers Waterhouse Challenge Shield'.

This race, now known as the Waterhouse Byrne Baird Shield, has been competed for every year on St. Stephen's Day (26th December), with the exception of 1916. It was because so many Donore members were away in the trenches of World War I that the 1916 race wasn’t held. Another factor was the proximity of the course to the Magazine Fort, which was then an ammunitions depot and the scene of one of the first casualties the Easter Rising Rebellion earlier that year. However, the race was held during the most part of World War I, and continued on during the Spanish flu, the Irish Civil War,  World War II, the Tuberculosis epidemic, outbreaks of Foot and Mouth disease, and the severe weather conditions of 1962 and 2010 in Ireland. During the Foot and Mouth outbreak in 1967, the race was held on the road. Athletes that year ran five laps of the 'Eagle Lap'. The quicker road times overall that year are not counted for shield race records. History will also show that the 2020 and 2021 versions of the race survived the COVID-19 pandemic. The race starts and finishes every year at the same tree beside the Dog Pond on the horse gallop in the Phoenix Park, Dublin. 

The shield has to be won three times by the same person in order for the trophy to be claimed as the property of any one individual. In 1918, Paddy Byrne, after winning the trophy three times, re-presented the trophy to the club, and the same thing happened when Davie Baird, a man who had been seriously wounded at the Somme, similarly had three victories. But he managed to return to win in 1920, 1921, and again in 1937, to become immortalised in the event’s title as it currently stands.

Leo Uhlemann has also won the trophy three times overall, but two of those occasions occurred after Davie Baird added his name to the trophy; thereby resetting the clock for all other previous winners. They had to begin again from scratch in their quest to win it three times in order to get their names added to the ’shield title’.

The closest finish was in 1962, when Leo Lynch got to finish less than one yard ahead of the fast finishing scratch man Mick Neville. Earlier that year in January & February Neville became the only athlete ever to win all four individual Irish Cross Country Championships: AAU and IAAB Senior and Junior/Intermediate.

No winner, however, was to be more celebrated than Frank Cahill. Born in 1900, he made his race debut in 1923. There then followed perhaps the most heroic series of failures in the history of athletics, because for the next 52 years he competed without success. In 1974, he was only 200 yards from the finish line when victory was snatched from his grasp. In 1975 he missed a race for the first time, due to a training accident but he returned in 1976 to finally triumph. Legend has it that “scratch athlete” – Eamonn Coghlan – was still finishing breakfast at home in Ranelagh when Cahill started out on the first of his five, two-mile laps. Within sight of the finish, he fell over; and had he accepted the help offered by concerned onlookers, he might have been disqualified. Luckily, he managed to get to his feet again unaided, and make it to the finish line without being caught and on to glory. His heroics made the front page of The Irish Times, where Peter Byrne noted that Irish sport had just been deprived of its “most illustrious loser”. As Byrne added, Cahill’s attempts to win had spanned the political careers of two Cosgraves, WT and Liam. But a year later, Liam Cosgrave was no longer taoiseach, and Cahill was still going strong. Proving that it’s never too late to start winning; Cahill retained the Shield in 1977: breaking his own record – which still stands – as the shield’s oldest winner at the age of 77!  In contrast, the youngest winner of the Shield was Willie Smith in 1958, aged 15 years.

Past winners 
 1896/97 J.J. Dunne
 1897/98 G. Hubard
 1898/99 M.E. Heyden
 1899/1900 D. Maher → → (Held 24 March 1900)
 1900/01 J. O’Donoghue
 1901/02 F. Moore
 1902/03 J.C. Greenan
 1903/04 T.P. Bolton
 1904/05 P. Mernagh
 1905/06 W.F. McLoughlin
 1906/07 M. Pender
 1907/08 M. Pender
 1908/09 H.B. Gunn
 1909/10 W. Waterfield
 1910/11 M. Cooke
 1911/12 G. Gilbert
 1912/13 W.E. Murray
 1913/14 J.S. Palmer
 1914/15 J. Byrne → → (Held 17 March 1915)
 1915/16 Paddy Byrne
 1916/17 No Race (due to World War I)
 1917/18 Paddy Byrne
 1918/19 Paddy Byrne (3rd Win)
 1919/20 P. McNamara
 1920/21 Davie Baird
 1921/22 Davie Baird
 1922/23 H. Rusk
 1923/24 P. Harris
 1924/25 Kenneth Coard
 1925/26 Kenneth Coard → → (Held 17 April 1926)
 1926/27 J.R. Harding
 1927/28 W. Goff
 1928/29 P. O'Farrell
 1929/30 B. Kelly
 1930/31 M.J. Solan
 1931/32 G. Kelly → → (Held 17 March 1932)
 1932/33 N.M. Kelly
 1933/34 F. Kavanagh
 1934/35 P.J. Cooper
 1935/36 J. Callan
 1936/37 Leo Uhlemann
 1937/38 Davie Baird (3rd Win) → → (Held 17 March 1938)
 1938/39 Leo Uhlemann → → (Held 17 March 1939)
 1939/40 W. Sherringham
 1940/41 L. Cooling → → (Held 17 March 1941)
 1941/42 Leo Uhlemann 
 1942/43 F. Daly
 1943/44 W. Bryan
 1944/45 M.D. Porter
 1945/46 L. Cooling
 1946/47 M.J. Harte
 1947/48 J. Crossan → → (Held 28 February 1948)
 1948/49 T.P. Duke
 1949/50 Seamus Kennelly
 1950/51 J. Owens
 1951/52 P. Cooke
 1952/53 Tommy Dunne
 1953/54 Dom Dicker
 1954/55 J. O'Reilly
 1955/56 C. McAlinden
 1956/57 P. Roche
 1957/58 Joe Dunne
 1958/59 Willie Smith (youngest winner – 15 years 39 days)
 1959/60 T. Tully
 1960/61 Dermot Lynskey
 1961/62 Bertie Messitt
 1962/63 Leo Lynch / 2nd - Mick Neville (closest finish – 1 yard)
 1963/64 Godfrey Dicker / 2nd - Willie Dunne
 1964/65 Tommy Redican
 1965/66 M. Cox
 1966/67 Paul McMahon
 1967/68 John Sheridan
 1968/69 Eddie Spillane
 1969/70 A. Dundas
 1970/71 E. Cooper
 1971/72 Willie Smith
 1972/73 Kevin Dunne
 1973/74 Eddie Spillane
 1974/75 Tony Brien
 1975/76 P. Nevin
 1976/77 Frank Cahill
 1977/78 Frank Cahill (oldest winner - 77 years 103 days)
 1978/79 T. Hopkins
 1979/80 Eamonn Coghlan (the only sub 50 minute time)
 1980/81 Ben Good
 1981/82 Joe Rankin
 1982/83 C. Lyons
 1983/84 L. Carey
 1984/85 John Sheridan
 1985/86 Valerie McGovern (1st Lady Winner)
 1986/87 Jim McNamara
 1987/88 C. Lyons
 1988/89 Valerie McGovern
 1989/90 A. Lynch
 1990/91 Joe Rankin
 1991/92 P. O'Reilly
 1992/93 Helen Saunders
 1993/94 D. Murphy
 1994/95 Eric Hayward
 1995/96 Donal O'Sullivan
 1996/97 M. Doyle
 1997/98 M. Doyle
 1998/99 D. Fenton
 1999/2000 F. Coffey
 2000/01: B. Cornelia
 2001/02: Adrienne Jordan
 2002/03: Richard Fitzgerald / 2nd - Donal Iremonger
 2003/04: Paul Graham
 2004/05: Iain Morrison / 2nd – Andrew Rogers / 3rd – Paul Graham
 2005/06: Mark Dooley / 2nd – Ciarán O'Flaherty / 3rd – Barry Potts
 2006/07: Susan Walsh / 2nd – Anne Curley / 3rd – Keith Daly
 2007/08: John Breen / 2nd – Colin Moore / 3rd – Ken Nugent
 2008/09: Simon Meyler / 2nd – Eileen Walsh / 3rd – Fred Kiernan
 2009/10: Fred Kiernan / 2nd – Andy Hanrahan / 3rd – Cindy Hickey
 2010/11: Colin Moore / 2nd – Tom Hickey / 3rd – Fergal Swaine
 2011/12: Arthur Connick / 2nd – Jonathan Daly / 3rd – Ken Nugent
 2012/13: Michelle Dawson / 2nd – Angela Eustace / 3rd – Terry Mee
 2013/14: Paul Cummins / 2nd – Barry Potts / 3rd – Angela Eustace
 2014/15: Ian Redican / 2nd – John Dunne / 3rd – Jim McNamara
 2015/16: Alan Farrell / 2nd – Tom Fagan / 3rd – George Brady
 2016/17: Tony Griffin / 2nd - Ian Redican / 3rd - Niall Lynch
 2017/18: Niamh O'Neill / 2nd - Barry Potts / 3rd - Desmond Gill
 2018/19: Anne Curley / 2nd - David Campbell / 3rd - Gavin Keogh
 2019/20: Luke Boland / 2nd - Julia Hackett / 3rd - Gavin Keogh
 2020/21: James Bolton / 2nd - Donal Iremonger / 3rd - Craig Scott
 2021/22: Ken Nugent / 2nd - Rossa Hurley / 3rd - Claire Mulligan
 2022/23: Deirdre Nic Canna / 2nd - Emmet Ó Briain / 3rd - Danny O’Sullivan

Shield Trivia 

 Youngest Winner - Willie Smith, 1958 (aged 15 years 39 days)
 Oldest Winner - Frank Cahill, 1977 (aged 77 years 103 days)
 1st Male Winner - J.J. Dunne, 1896
 1st Female Winner - Valerie McGovern, 1988
 Fastest Male Time - Eamonn Coghlan, 1979 (49:56 - the only sub 50 minute time)
 Fastest Female Time - Barbera Cleary, 2021 (62:10)
 1st Two-time Winner - M. Pender, 1907
 1st Three-time Winner - Paddy Byrne, 1918 (his name was added to the shield, then becoming known as the Waterhouse Byrne Shield) 
 1st Back to Back Winner - M. Pender, 1906 & 1907
 1st Double Sibling Winners - Tommy Dunne, 1952 / Joe Dunne, 1957
 1st Triple Sibling Winners - Tommy Dunne, 1952 / Joe Dunne, 1957 / Kevin Dunne, 1972
 1st Father & Son Winners - Tommy Redican, 1964 / Ian Redican, 2014 (50 years to the day)
 1st Sibling Winner & Runner-up - 1924 - Kenneth Coard (Race Winner) / Douglas Coard (2nd in race) 
 Closest Finish - 1962 when Leo Lynch (Handicap of 21 minutes) held on by 'one yard' ahead of 'scratch man' Mick Neville.

Fastest Times Leaderboard 

 49:56 - Eamonn Coghlan, 1979 (Winner - running off scratch)
 50:31 - Eamonn Coghlan, 1977 (4th in race)
 50:50 - Tom O'Riordan, 1966 (7th in race - running off scratch)
 51:00 - Bertie Messitt, 1961 (Winner - running off scratch)
 51:09 - Mick Neville, 1962 (2nd in race)
 51:10 - Tony Brien, 1978 (4th in race)
 51:28 - Eamonn Coghlan, 1975 (5th in race)
 51:39 - Tom O'Riordan, 1971 (2nd in race)
 51:53 - Tony Brien, 1974 (Winner - running off scratch)
 52:30 - Eamonn Coghlan, 1978 (7th in race)
 52:42 - John Sheridan, 1976 (6th in race)
 52:56 - Donal O'Sullivan, 1995
 52:58 - Tony Murphy, 1964 (4th in race)
 53:07 - Tommy Redican, 1971 (5th in race)
 53:08 - Eddie Spillane, 1964 (2nd in race)
 53:18 - Tom O'Riordan, 1976 (7th in race)
 53:35 - Eddie Spillane, 1971 (6th in race)
 53:54 - Willie Dunne, 1971 (8th in race - running off scratch)
 53:56 - Jim McNamara, 1976 (8th in race)
 54:15 - Willie Dunne, 1964 (8th in race)
 54:28 - Jim McNamara, 1964 (7th in race)
 54:33 - John Travers, 2015 (5th in race)
 54:46 - B. Dunne, 1964 (9th in race)

Evolution of the Shield Name 
(3 wins are required for a name to be added to the Shield)

1896-1918: The Donore Harriers Waterhouse Challenge Shield 
Two-time Winner
 M. Pender (1906 & 1907)
Three-time Winner 
 Paddy Byrne (1915, 1917 & 1918)
Paddy Byrne, after winning the trophy three times, re-presented the shield to the club and it henceforth became known as 'The Waterhouse Byrne Shield'

1919-1938: The Waterhouse Byrne Shield 
Two-time Winner
 Kenneth Coard (1924 & 1925)
Three-time Winner 
 Davie Baird (1920, 1921 & 1937)
Davie Baird, after winning the trophy three times, re-presented the shield to the club and it henceforth became known as 'The Waterhouse Byrne Baird Shield'

Since 1938: The Waterhouse Byrne Baird Shield 
Two-time Winners
 Leo Uhlemann (1938 & 1941)
 L. Cooling (1940 & 1945)
 Willie Smith (1958 & 1971)
 John Sheridan (1967 & 1984)
 Eddie Spillane (1968 & 1973)
 Frank Cahill (1976 & 1977)
 Joe Rankin (1981 & 1990)
 C. Lyons (1982 & 1987)
 M. Doyle (1996 & 1997)

Other Donore Harrier Trophies

The Faugh-a-Ballagh Challenge Cup 
The Faugh-a-Ballagh Cup is contested by club runners from the men's section of Donore Harriers annually over 6 Miles traditionally in the Phoenix Park, Dublin. It is the Donore Harriers Club Cross Country Championships Cup. Since 2017, Donore women compete on the same day for the Jim McNamara Cup.

The course traditionally takes in the horse gallop trail, which runs adjacent to Chesterfield Avenue in the Phoenix Park. It turns close to the stone wall, which is in the clearing at the end of the gallop & with the Pope's Cross in view. It turns back entering the inside part of the tress at the top of the Kyber before emerging through the open ground with its numerous dips, heading in the direction of the Civil Service Pavilion; where loops around again to the Horse Gallop.

The Faugh-a-Ballagh Cup which was first awarded in 1907 to the senior men's winner, is one of the oldest trophies in Donore Harriers; and club trophies in Ireland. It was presented by the 87th Royal Irish Fusiliers in 1907 as a perpetual trophy for the men's club cross country championship over 6 miles.

The first running of the cup took place in Meadowbrook, Dundrum. A report from the time stated that there was "a big gathering of spectators,
including many old associates of the club foregathered to witness what turned out to be a very interesting event..." It goes on to give at length to give details of the race, including that, '"V.P. McDonagh, Hon. Secretary sent the 13 competitors on their journey to a capital start"

Previous winners of the cup include well known Irish International and Donore Harriers Athletes: Bertie Messitt, Tom O’Riordan and Jim McNamara.

L.Kelly was the first winner of the cup. Since then there have been three '4 time' winners of the cup:
 Paddy Byrne 'the Byrne from the Waterhouse Byrne Baird Shield' - 1916/1917/1919/1920
 Kevin Maguire - 1948/1949/1950/1951
 Eddie Spillane - 1970/1971/1973/1974

However, the most prolific winner was Bertie Messitt with six wins in 1953, 1958, 1959, 1960, 1961 and 1964.

Other notable winners of the cup were :
 Tom O'Riordan (3) - 1967/1968/1969 (Olympian - 1964, Tokyo / 9 times Irish Cross Country International)
 Jim McNamara (2) - 1965/1966 (Olympian - 1976, Montreal)
 Tony Brien (3) - 1975/1978/1979 (4 time Irish Cross Country International)

Other Donore Harriers Internationals to win the Cup were:
 Tommy Dunne (2)
 Mick Neville (2)
 Jack Dougan (2)
 Tony Murphy
 John Phelan

Faugh-a-Ballagh Cup Previous Winners 
 1907 - L. Byrne
 1908 -  
 1909 -  
 1910 -  
 1911 -  
 1912 -  
 1913 -  
 1914 -  
 1915 - 
 1916 - Paddy Byrne
 1917 - Paddy Byrne
 1919 - Paddy Byrne
 1920 - Paddy Byrne
 1921 -  
 1922 -  
 1923 -  
 1924 -  
 1925 - Douglas Coard
 1926 - Ken Coard
 1927 -  
 1928 - Douglas Coard
 1929 -  
 1930 -  
 1931 -  
 1932 -  
 1933 -  
 1934 -  
 1935 -  
 1936 - T. Hopkins
 1937 -  
 1938 - J. Callan
 1939 - T. Hopkins
 1940 - W. Sherringham
 1941 - S. Banks
 1942 - S. Banks
 1943 - B. Foreman
 1944 - B. Foreman
 1945 -  
 1946 - 
 1947 - Pat Haughey
 1948 - Kevin Maguire
 1949 - Kevin Maguire
 1950 - Kevin Maguire
 1951 - Kevin Maguire
 1952 - S. Kennelly
 1953 - Bertie Messit
 1954 - Jack Dougan
 1955 - Jack Dougan
 1956 - Tommy Dunne
 1957 - 
 1958 - Bertie Messit
 1959 - Bertie Messit
 1959 - Bertie Messit
 1960 - Bertie Messit
 1961 - Bertie Messit
 1962 - Mick Neville
 1963 - Mick Neville (29:27) / 2nd: M. Connolly (29:55) / 3rd: B. Dunne (30:30)
 1964 - Bertie Messit
 1965 - Jim McNamara
 1966 - Jim McNamara (33:30) / 2nd: T. Hopkins (35:10) / 3rd: W. Dunne (35:33)
 1967 - Tom O'Riordan
 1968 - Tom O'Riordan
 1969 - Tom O'Riordan (31:03) / 2nd: J. Sheridan (31:33) / 3rd: T. Redican (32:44)
 1970 - Eddie Spillane (31:07) / 2nd: J. McNamara (31:10) / 3rd: T. Redican (31:31)
 1971 - Eddie Spillane (31:07) / 2nd: T. Redican (31:08) / 3rd: J. McNamara (31:32),
 1972 - 
 1973 - Eddie Spillane
 1974 - Eddie Spillane
 1975 - Tony Brien
 1976 - 
 1977 - 
 1978 - Tony Brien
 1979 - Tony Brien
 1980 -  
 1981 -  
 1982 -  
 1983 -  
 1984 -  
 1985 -  
 1986 -  
 1987 -  
 1988 - C. Lyons
 1989 -  
 1990 -  
 1991 -  
 1992 -  
 1993 -  
 1994 -  
 1995 -  
 1996 - C. Lyons
 1997 - C. Lyons
 1998 -  
 1999 -  
 2000 -  
 2001 -  
 2002 -  
 2003 -  
 2004 -  
 2005 -  
 2006 -  
 2007 - George Brady
 2008 -  
 2009 -  
 2010 -  
 2011 -  
 2012 -  
 2013 -  
 2014 -  
 2015 -  
 2016 - 
 2017 - Fergal Swaine
 2018 - Alan Farrell
 2019 - Des Tremble
 2020 - Josh O’Sullivan-Hourihan

Jim McNamara Cup Previous Winners 
 2017 - Barbera Cleary
 2018 - Maura Kearns
 2019 - Barbera Cleary
 2020 - Grace Kennedy-Clarke

Faugh-a-Ballagh and the Donore Connection with the Royal Dublin Fusiliers 
The club along with many members of Donore Harriers has a strong connection with the Royal Dublin Fusiliers. Davie Baird joined the 10th Battalion of the Royal Dublin Fusiliers and was badly wounded at the Battle of Ancre in 1916. He made a full recovery and went on to win, most famously the Waterhouse Byrne Shield over three occasions to add his name to that trophy.

There is also an amazing connection and coincidence between 6-time winner of the cup Bertie Messitt and the Fusiliers and the Faugh-a-Ballagh Cup. Years before he joined Donore Harriers, due to lack of work he joined the British Army in 1946, aged 18. His regiment, the Royal Irish Fusiliers were known worldwide as the 'Faughs'. Bertie wrote poetry, and he wrote this short poem about his time in the Regiment:

FAUGH-A-BALLAGH

I wore a hackle in my hat,

and marched behind a band.

Carried a Lee Enfield rifle,

and served in foreign lands.

They were the best days of my life,

I cherish those golden years.

When I was a proud member of

the Irish Fusiliers.

Strahan-Cahill Cup 
The Strahan Cahill Cup is a Donore Harriers Club Cross-Country Handicap race run over 6 Miles traditionally in the Phoenix Park alongside the Faugh-a-Ballagh Cup.

References

  The Blue Cap
 'Faugh-a-Ballagh' poem by B. Messitt, 1947
 Faugh-a-Ballagh race report, 1907, Donore Harriers Archives

External sources
 www.donoreharriers.com
 Maurice Ahern, Sunday Miscellany on RTÉ Radio on Sunday 22 December 2013
 Frank Greally, – 5 December 2013, http://www.independent.ie (Lifestyle/Health Section)
 Phoenix Park Events (December 2014) http://www.phoenixpark.ie/media/Events%202014.pdf

Athletics in Dublin (city)
1896 establishments in Ireland
Annual sporting events in Ireland
Cross country running competitions
Recurring sporting events established in 1896
Cross country running in Ireland